Lu Jeu Sham (Chinese: 沈呂九) (born April 28, 1938) is an American physicist. He is best known for his work with Walter Kohn on the Kohn–Sham equations.

Biography
Lu Jeu Sham's family was from Fuzhou, Fujian, but he was born in British Hong Kong on April 28, 1938. He was graduated from the Pui Ching Middle School in 1955 and then traveled to England for his higher education. He received his Bachelor of Science in Mathematics (1st Class Honors) from Imperial College, University of London in 1960 and his PhD in physics from the University of Cambridge in 1963. In 1963-66, he worked with Prof. W. Kohn as a postdoctoral fellow in University of California, San Diego. From 1966 to 1967, Sham worked in University of California, Irvine  as Assistant Professor in Physics and from 1967 to 1968 in Queen Mary College, University of London as a Reader. He joined the faculty of University of California in 1968. Sham was a professor in the Department of Physics at University of California, San Diego, eventually serving as department head. He is now a UCSD professor emeritus.

Sham was elected to the National Academy of Sciences in 1998.

Scientific contributions
Sham is noted for his work on density functional theory (DFT) with Walter Kohn, which resulted in the Kohn–Sham equations of DFT. The Kohn–Sham method is widely used in materials science. Kohn received a Nobel Prize in Chemistry in 1998 for the Kohn–Sham equations and other work related to DFT.

Sham's other research interests include condensed matter physics and optical control of electron spins in semiconductor nanostructures for quantum information processing.

Honors and awards 
Member of the US National Academy of Sciences (1998)
Member of Academia Sinica (1998)
Fellow of American Association for the Advancement of Science (2011)
Fellow of American Physics Society (1977)
Fellow of Optica (formerly OSA) (2009)
The Willis E. Lamb Award for Laser Science and Quantum Optics (2004)
The MRS Materials Theory Award (2019)
Humboldt Foundation Award (1978)
Guggenheim Fellowship (1983)

References 

1938 births
Living people
University of California, San Diego faculty
Hong Kong physicists
Alumni of Imperial College London
Alumni of the University of Cambridge
Computational chemists
Fellows of the American Physical Society